Argyrochosma fendleri, Fendler's false cloak fern, is a fern known from the western United States and northwestern Mexico. It grows in rocky habitats, and is distinguished from other members of the genus by its zig-zag leaf axes. Like many species in the genus, it bears white powder on the underside of its leaves. First described as a species in 1851, it was transferred to the new genus Argyrochosma (the "false cloak ferns") in 1987, recognizing their distinctness from the "cloak ferns" (Notholaena sensu stricto).

Description
Argyrochosma fendleri is a medium-sized epipetric fern. From it, numerous fronds arise in dense clumps. Of this length, about half is made up by the stipe (the stalk of the leaf, below the blade), which is round, hairless, and chestnut-brown in color.

The leaf blades are deltate (triangular) in shape, highly divided (from four to six successive subdivisions) at the base, sometimes broader than they are long. They curl slightly upwards when dried. The rachis (leaf axis) is round, rather than flattened, hairless, and zig-zags rather than being straight. Each blade bears 4 to 6 pairs of pinnae, whose costae also zig-zag, with subdivisions branching off at the angles. The ultimate segments are ovate to lanceolate or oblong, obtuse at the tip and broadly cuneate (wedge-shaped) at the base, and sometimes have an crenate (round-toothed) margin. The dark color of the axes passes into the segment base, without a distinct joint, and pinnae and subsequent subdivisions are borne on long stalks. The underside of the leaf is coated in pale white farina (powder), and a scattering of glands and farina is sometimes present on the upper surface. The leaf tissue is leathery to somewhat leafy in texture.

The sori lie along the veins, along the final quarter of the length of the veins closest to the edge of the leaf. The veins themselves tend to blend into the leaf tissue. The leaf edges are not modified into false indusia, and may be flat or curled under to cover the sori. Each sporangium bears 64 spores. The plants are diploid, with a chromosome number of 2n = 54.

The zig-zag rachis and axes generally serve to distinguish it from other members of the genus. A. limitanea may have slightly zig-zag axes, but its subdivisions are not as strongly spreading. Furthermore, A. limitanea is apogamous and only contains 32, rather than 64, spores per sporangium.

Taxonomy
The species was first described by Gustav Kunze in 1851 as Notholaena fendleri, based on material collected in New Mexico by Augustus Fendler, for whom it is named. Delineating natural genera in the cheilanthoids has proven to be extremely difficult, and other placements of the species were subsequently put forward. Fée transferred it to Cincinalis as Cincinalis fendleri in 1852, breaking with most other authorities in recognizing and re-circumscribing that genus. In 1859, Mettenius rejected Fée's attempt to delineate Cincinalis as a separate genus, but recognized the genus Gymnogramma for species where sporangia were borne along the nerves and not densely clustered at the end of the nerves. He transferred the species there as G. fendleri. Prantl expanded Pellaea to include several genera in which he perceived close affinities, including Cincinalis. Accordingly, he transferred C. fendleri to Pellaea section Cincinalis as P. fendleri in 1882. In 1979, John T. Mickel transferred it to Cheilanthes as Cheilanthes cancellata (the epithet fendleri was preoccupied), as part of an effort to create a more coherent Notholaena.

By the late 20th century, most authorities favored placement of Notholaena nivea and closely related ferns, including N. fendleri, either in Notholaena or Pellaea. Both Edwin Copeland and C. A. Weatherby suggested in the 1940s that this group of ferns might represent a distinct genus of its own. This was finally addressed in 1987 by Michael D. Windham, who was carrying out phylogenetic studies of these genera. He elevated Notholaena sect. Argyrochosma to become the genus Argyrochosma, and transferred this species to that genus as A. fendleri. In 2018, Maarten J. M. Christenhusz transferred the species to Hemionitis as H. engywookii (the epithet fendleri was preoccupied), as part of a program to consolidate the cheilanthoid ferns into that genus. The epithet refers to the gnome scientist Engywook in the novel The Neverending Story.

Phylogenetic studies have shown that A. fendleri forms an isolated clade, diverging at an early date from the other two clades of farina-bearing Argyrochosma. Its farina is chemically distinct from that of other Argyrochosma, consisting mostly of eriodictyol-7-methyl ether, a compound rare in ferns.

Distribution and habitat
Argyrochosma fendleri is known in the United States from New Mexico, Colorado, and the southeastern corner of Wyoming, and in Mexico from Sonora.

It grows on rocky cliffs and slopes, particularly on granitic and igneous rocks, the only member of the genus to prefer this substrate.

Conservation
Under the NatureServe conservation status system, A. dealbata is ranked as vulnerable (G3), but it is considered critically imperiled in Wyoming and vulnerable in Colorado.

Cultivation
The horticulturist George Schneider, considered it suitable for conservation, noting that it "thrives well under cool treatment", perhaps in contrast to tropical ferns.

Notes and references

References

Works cited

External links
Isotype of the species at JSTOR Plant Science.
Colorado Rare Plant Guide
Images at plantsystematics.org

fendleri
Plants described in 1851
Ferns of Mexico
Ferns of the United States
Flora of Sonora